The  is an electric multiple unit (EMU) train type operated by private railway operator Keikyu on commuter services in the Tokyo area of Japan since 1985.

Operations
The eight-car sets are primarily used on limited-stop "Rapid Limited Express" and "Limited Express" services on the Keikyu Main Line, including through-running services to and from the Toei Asakusa Line and the Keisei Oshiage Line. The four- and six-car sets are mostly used on all-stations "Local" services. The 1500 series sets can be used in multiple with other Keikyu EMU types, including the 600 series, N1000 series, 2000 series, and 2100 series.

Formations

As of March 2023, the fleet consists of 138 vehicles formed as six-car, and eight-car sets, as follows.

4-car sets 1501 to 1525

 The "M1c" and "M1" cars are each fitted with one lozenge-type pantograph.
 Sets 1501 to 1517 have steel bodies, all of which are now retired as of March 2023. All other sets have aluminum bodies.

6-car sets 1529 to 1549, 1561 to 1593
15 six-car formed by adding two 1900 trailer cars to four-car sets. 

 The "M1c" cars are fitted with one lozenge-type pantograph, and the "M1" cars are fitted with two.

8-car sets 1701 to 1731
5 eight-car sets formed by adding two 1900 trailer cars to six-car sets.

 The "M1c" and end "M1" cars are each fitted with one lozenge-type pantograph, and the centre "M1" cars are fitted with two.

Interior
Passenger accommodation consists of longitudinal bench seating throughout.

History

The 1500 series fleet was built between 1985 and 1991. The first five four-car sets delivered had steel bodies, while all subsequent sets had aluminium bodies with door pocket windows discontinued. Sets built from 1990 onward used VVVF control.

A programme of life-extension refurbishment commenced in 2002. This involved adding new air-conditioning units, removing the original door pocket windows of the steel bodied cars, and adding front-end skirts.

On 24 September 2012, set 1701 derailed between Oppama Station and Keikyu Taura Station. It was since retired and was replaced by Keikyu N1000 set 1169.

Withdrawal 
As part of Keikyu's FY2022 Railway Business Capital Investment Plan, retirements of the first five four-car steeled body sets, numbered 1501 - 1517, commenced in May 2022 with the introduction of new 4-car stainless steel N1000-1890 series sets.

Livery variations
From 25 February 2018, four-car set 1521 was finished in a special "Keikyu 120 years of progress" livery with each of the four cars carrying a different livery used by Keikyu trains in the past. The livery remained on the car until 24 February 2019. Car 1 carries the dark red used on 51 series EMUs from 1924 to 1965, car 2 carries the red and yellow livery used on 500 series and other trains from 1951 to 1963, car 3 carries the red livery used on 1500 series and other trains since 1953, and car 4 carries the red and white livery used on 800, N1000 and 2100 series trains since 1978.

References

External links

 Keikyu 1500 series official information 

Electric multiple units of Japan
1500 series
Train-related introductions in 1985
1500 V DC multiple units of Japan
Kawasaki multiple units
Tokyu Car multiple units